Walter Frere (fl. 1381 – 1388), of Wycombe, Buckinghamshire, was an English politician.

He was a relative of late 14th, early 15th century MP William Frere, but the exact connection is unknown.

He was a Member (MP) of the Parliament of England for Wycombe in 1381, 1386 and February 1388.

References

Year of birth missing
Year of death missing
English MPs 1381
People from Buckinghamshire
Walter
English MPs 1386
English MPs February 1388